San Antonio de Areco Airport is an airport  northeast of San Antonio de Areco, a town in the Buenos Aires Province of Argentina.

The San Antonio De Areco VOR-DME (Ident: SNT) is located on the field.

See also

Transport in Argentina
List of airports in Argentina

References

External links 
OpenStreetMap - Aeroclub Areco Airport
OurAirports - San Antonio De Areco Airport
FallingRain - San Antonio de Areco Airport

Airports in Argentina
Buenos Aires Province